The action of Atlixco, also known as the Atlixco affair, on October 19, 1847, was a U.S. victory late in the Mexican–American War by an American force under General Joseph Lane that defeated the Light Corps of the Mexican Army under General Joaquín Rea and captured their base at Atlixco a week after Lane had driven Rea from his lines and relieved the Siege of Puebla.

See also
 Battles of the Mexican–American War

References

1847 in Mexico
Action of Atlixco
Puebla
1847 in the Mexican-American War
Battles involving Mexico
Battles involving the United States
October 1847 events